Cerithiella sigsbeana is a species of sea snail, a gastropod in the family Cerithiopsidae, which is known from the Gulf of Mexico. It was described by Dall in 1881.

Description 
The maximum recorded shell length is 13.3 mm.

Habitat 
Minimum recorded depth is 53 m. Maximum recorded depth is 419 m.

References

External links
 Dall W. H. 1881. Reports on the results of dredging, under the supervision of Alexander Agassiz, in the Gulf of Mexico and in the Caribbean Sea (1877-78), by the United States Coast Survey Steamer "Blake", Lieutenant-Commander C.D. Sigsbee, U.S.N., and Commander J.R. Bartlett, U.S.N., commanding. XV. Preliminary report on the Mollusca. Bulletin of the Museum of Comparative Zoölogy at Harvard College, 9(2): 33-144
 Fernandes M.R., Garofalo R. & Pimenta A.D. (2015). New species and records of Newtoniellinae (Caenogastropoda, Newtoniellidae) from Brazil. Journal of the Marine Biological Association of the United Kingdom. 95(4): 791-804

Newtoniellidae
Gastropods described in 1881